Avatar is a studio album by the indie rock band Comets on Fire. It was released in 2006 on Sub Pop.

Track listing
"Dogwood Rust" – 7:48
"Jaybird" – 6:08
"Lucifer's Memory" – 7:03
"The Swallow's Eye" – 6:53
"Holy Teeth" – 2:59
"Sour Smoke" – 8:47
"Hatched Upon the Age" – 6:08

References

Comets on Fire albums
2006 albums
Sub Pop albums